Infantile fibromatosis may refer to:

 Aggressive infantile fibromatosis
 Infantile digital fibromatosis